Philip Rashleigh (1689–1736) of Menabilly, near Fowey, Cornwall, was a British landowner and politician who sat in the House of Commons from 1710 to 1722.

Early life
Rashleigh was the eldest surviving son of Jonathan Rashleigh MP, of Menabilly and his second wife Jane Carew, a daughter of Sir John Carew, 3rd Baronet of Antony, Torpoint, Cornwall. He succeeded to his father’s estates in 1702, when still a minor and was under the guardianship of his uncles. He was educated at Winchester College from 1704 to 1706 and matriculated at New College, Oxford on 4 September 1707, aged 18.

Career
Rashleigh was returned unopposed as Member of Parliament for Liskeard at the 1710 general election. He was an inactive MP and was classed as a Tory. He was returned unopposed again at the 1713 general election, and at the 1715 general election. He was a Tory and in 1715 a treasonable pamphlet was addressed to him which was seized on government orders in the post at Exeter. He did not stand at the 1722 general election.

Rashleigh rebuilt Menabilly House circa 1710-15.

Death and legacy
Rashleigh died unmarried on 12 August 1736, and his estates were inherited by his younger brother Jonathan.

References

Philip
1689 births
1736 deaths
Members of the Parliament of Great Britain for constituencies in Cornwall
British MPs 1710–1713
British MPs 1713–1715
British MPs 1715–1722